The 2012 BNP Paribas Open (also known as the 2012 Indian Wells Masters) was a professional tennis tournament played at Indian Wells, California in March 2012. It was the 39th edition of the men's event (24th for the women), known as the BNP Paribas Open, and was classified as an ATP World Tour Masters 1000 event on the 2012 ATP World Tour and a Premier Mandatory event on the 2012 WTA Tour. Both the men's and the women's events took place at the Indian Wells Tennis Garden in Indian Wells, California, United States from March 5 through March 18, 2012 and were played on outdoor hard courts. Roger Federer and Victoria Azarenka won the singles titles.

Finals

Men's singles

 Roger Federer defeated  John Isner, 7–6(9–7), 6–3
It was Federer's 3rd title of the year and 73rd of his career. It was his 4th win at Indian Wells, also winning in 2004, 2005, and 2006. It was his 19th career Masters win, tying the record held by Rafael Nadal.

Women's singles

 Victoria Azarenka defeated  Maria Sharapova, 6–2, 6–3.
It was Azarenka's 4th title of the year and 12th of her career. Azarenka is now 23–0 for the year. It was her 3rd career Premier Mandatory event and 7th Premier overall.

Men's doubles

 Marc López /  Rafael Nadal defeated  John Isner /  Sam Querrey, 6–2, 7–6(7–3)

Women's doubles

 Liezel Huber /  Lisa Raymond defeated  Sania Mirza /  Elena Vesnina, 6–2, 6–3.

Points and prize money

Point distribution

Prize money
All money is in US dollars

Players

Men's singles

Seeds

 1 Rankings are as of March 5, 2012

Other entrants
The following players got wildcards into the singles main draw:
 Robby Ginepri
 Denis Kudla
 Jesse Levine
 Sam Querrey
 Jack Sock

The following player received entry using a protected ranking into the singles main draw:
 Tommy Haas

The following players received entry from the qualifying draw:

 Ruben Bemelmans
 Sergei Bubka
 Amer Delić
 Rik de Voest
 Matthew Ebden
 Andrey Golubev
 Paolo Lorenzi
 Marinko Matosevic
 Vasek Pospisil
 Bobby Reynolds
 Tim Smyczek
 Rhyne Williams

The following players received entry as lucky losers:
 Frederico Gil
 Tobias Kamke
 Björn Phau

Withdrawals
  James Blake → replaced by  Matthias Bachinger
  Juan Carlos Ferrero → replaced by  Frederico Gil
  Fabio Fognini → replaced by  Lu Yen-hsun
  Ivan Ljubičić → replaced by  Leonardo Mayer
  Gaël Monfils (gastroenteritis) → replaced by  Björn Phau
  Albert Montañés → replaced by  Benoît Paire
  Philipp Petzschner → replaced by  David Nalbandian
  Tommy Robredo → replaced by  Nicolas Mahut
  Robin Söderling (mononucleosis) → replaced by  Jérémy Chardy
  Dmitry Tursunov → replaced by  Tobias Kamke
  Filippo Volandri → replaced by  Cedrik-Marcel Stebe
  Mikhail Youzhny → replaced by  Steve Darcis

Retirements
  Nikolay Davydenko (illness)
  Philipp Kohlschreiber (illness)
  Michaël Llodra (knee injury)
  Andreas Seppi (illness)

Men's doubles

Seeds

 Rankings are as of March 5, 2012

Other entrants
The following pairs received wildcards into the doubles main draw:
  Nicolás Almagro /  Mark Knowles
  Matthew Ebden /  Ryan Harrison

The following pair received entry as alternates:
  Carlos Berlocq /  Juan Ignacio Chela

Retirements
  Jürgen Melzer (illness)

Women's singles

Seeds

 1 Rankings are as of February 27, 2012

Other entrants
The following players received wildcards into the main draw:
 Jill Craybas
 Lauren Davis
 Irina Falconi
 Jamie Hampton
 Sania Mirza
 Urszula Radwańska
 Sloane Stephens
 Coco Vandeweghe

The following player received entry using a protected ranking:
 Timea Bacsinszky

The following players received entry from the qualifying draw: 

 Gréta Arn
 Kristina Barrois
 Eleni Daniilidou
 Casey Dellacqua
 Olga Govortsova
 Michaëlla Krajicek
 Varvara Lepchenko
 Alexandra Panova
 Jessica Pegula
 Lesia Tsurenko
 Aleksandra Wozniak
 Zhang Shuai

Withdrawals
  Serena Williams (continued boycott of the event since 2001) → replaced by  Sofia Arvidsson
  Anna Chakvetadze → replaced by  Arantxa Rus
  Kim Clijsters (left ankle injury) → replaced by  Lourdes Domínguez Lino
  Rebecca Marino → replaced by  Kimiko Date-Krumm
  Andrea Petkovic (lower back injury) → replaced by  Sílvia Soler Espinosa

Retirements
  Gréta Arn (neck injury)
  Jelena Dokić (wrist injury)
  Alexandra Dulgheru (knee injury)
  Jamie Hampton
  Ana Ivanovic (hip injury)
  Vania King (illness)
  Tamira Paszek
  Magdaléna Rybáriková
  Francesca Schiavone (illness)
  Vera Zvonareva (intestinal illness)

Women's doubles

Seeds

 Rankings are as of February 27, 2012

Other entrants
The following pairs received wildcards into the doubles main draw:
  Victoria Azarenka /  Petra Kvitová
  Eleni Daniilidou /  Jelena Janković
  Gisela Dulko /  Paola Suárez
  Jamie Hampton /  Christina McHale

References

External links

Association of Tennis Professionals (ATP) tournament profile

 
BNP Paribas Open
BNP Paribas Open
2012
BNP Paribas Open
BNP Paribas Open